is a Japanese former professional basketball player who last played for the Iwate Big Bulls of the B.League in Japan. He was selected by the Toyama Grouses with the 4th overall pick in the 2012 bj League draft. On August 16, 2016, Fujie signed with the Akita Happinets.

Career statistics

Regular season 

|-
| align="left" | 2011-12
| align="left" | TGI
| 27 || 27 || 32.4 || 35.8 || 29.1 || 76.4 || 2.5 || 2.0 || 0.3 || 0 ||  13.04
|-
| align="left" | 2012-13
| align="left" | Toyama
| 48 || 6 || 20.1 || 29.4 || 29.5 || 76.5 || 1.0 || 1.3 || 0.6 || 0.1 ||  6.7
|-
| align="left" | 2013-14
| align="left" | Toyama
| 48 || 46 || 29.3 || 32.7 || 28.7 || 73.1 || 1.4 || 2.2 || 0.6 || 0.0 ||  9.9
|-
| align="left" | 2014-15
| align="left" | Toyama
| 50 || 50 || 32.2 || 34.5 || 25.0 || 66.4 || 1.3 || 3.8 || 0.5 || 0.1 ||  10.0
|-
| align="left" | 2015-16
| align="left" | Iwate
| 52 || 33 || 25.8 || 39.1 || 30.4 || 69.1 || 1.9 || 2.2 || 0.8 || 0.0 || 11.7
|-
|style="background-color:#FFCCCC" align="left" | 2016-17
| align="left" | Akita
| 40 || 3 || 7.5 || 28.6 || 13.3 ||76.5  || 0.5 || 0.5 ||0.2  || 0.0 ||  1.5
|-
| style="background-color:#FFCCCC" align="left" | 2017-18
| align="left" | Iwate
| 59 || 35 || 22.8 || 35.0 || 23.9 ||67.8  || 1.5 || 2.9 ||0.6  || 0.0 || 5.9
|-
| align="left" | 2018-19
| align="left" | Iwate
| 60 || 59 || 28.6 || 38.6 || 27.1 ||72.2  || 2.6 || 3.7 ||0.6  || 0.1 || 10.9
|-
| align="left" | 2019-20
| align="left" | Iwate
| 28 || 1 || 13.6 || 38.0 || 38.9 ||69.2  || 0.9 || 1.1 ||0.2  || 0.0 || 3.8
|-

Playoffs 

|-
|style="text-align:left;"|2016-17
|style="text-align:left;"|Akita
| 3 || 1 ||  || .200 || .000 || .000 || 1.0 || 2.33 || 0.33 || 0 || 0.7
|-

Trivia
 He wanted to become a Japan Self-Defense Forces soldier.
 He likes Harami meat, and music of Kana Nishino.

References

1987 births
Living people
Akita Northern Happinets players
Iwate Big Bulls players
Japanese men's basketball players
Sportspeople from Fukuoka (city)
TGI D-Rise players
Toyama Grouses players
Forwards (basketball)
Guards (basketball)